Daniel Williams was an American politician. He was the first Secretary of State of Mississippi, serving from 1817 to 1821.

Biography 
Daniel Williams was unanimously elected by the Mississippi Legislature as the first Secretary of State of Mississippi on December 11, 1817.. He was re-elected unanimously on January 18, 1820. Williams resigned from the office in 1821, and the 1821 Mississippi Legislature elected John A. Grimball to replace him on November 13, 1821.

References 

18th-century births
19th-century deaths
Secretaries of State of Mississippi
Year of birth missing
Year of death missing